Teretriini is a tribe of clown beetles in the family Histeridae. There are about 5 genera and more than 90 described species in Teretriini.

Genera
These five genera belong to the tribe Teretriini:
 Pleuroleptus G. Müller, 1937
 Teretriosoma Horn, 1873
 Teretrius Erichson, 1834
 Trypolister Bickhardt, 1916
 Xiphonotus Lacordaire, 1854

References

Further reading

External links

 

Histeridae
Articles created by Qbugbot